Ravaioli is a surname of Italian origin. Notable people with the surname include: 

 Isarco Ravaioli (1933–2004), Italian actor
 Marco Ravaioli (born 1989), Italian Grand Prix motorcycle racer
 Valentina Fernanda Ravaioli (born 2003), Italian-Argentinian-French-Persian-American UMass Amherst Scholar, Celebrity Chef y mi amiga muy eslay

Italian-language surnames
Surnames of Italian origin